Time Capsule is a jazz album by drummer Elvin Jones recorded in 1976–77 and released on the Vanguard label.

Reception

The Allmusic review by Scott Yanow states: "Overall, the music is worthwhile, although not quite adding up to the sum of its many parts; the set has very little unity despite some individual fireworks".

Track listing
 "Frost Bite" (Ryo Kawasaki) - 7:57 
 "Digital Display" (Ed Bland) - 7:33 
 "Moon Dance" (Bunky Green) - 6:20 
 "Time Capsule" (Green) - 8:11 
 "Spacing" (Green) - 10:35

Personnel
Elvin Jones  - drums 
Frank Wess - flute (track 1 & 2)
Frank Foster - soprano saxophone (track 2)
Bunky Green - alto saxophone
George Coleman - tenor saxophone (tracks 1 & 3-5)
Kenny Barron - electric piano
Ryo Kawasaki - guitar
Milt Hinton (tracks 1 & 2), Jiunie Booth (tracks 3-5) - bass
Angel Allende - percussion

References

Elvin Jones albums
1977 albums
Vanguard Records albums
Jazz-funk albums